Nicholas Eversman (born February 15, 1986) is an American actor, best known for his roles as Michael Winstone on the ABC mystery drama Missing and Liam Jones II on the ABC fantasy adventure drama Once Upon a Time

Filmography

Film

Television

References

External links
 

1986 births
Male actors from Wisconsin
American male film actors
American male television actors
Living people
Actors from Madison, Wisconsin
21st-century American male actors